Kongla Lekkla (Thai ก้องหล้า เหล็กกล้า), is a Thai futsal Defender, and a member of  Thailand national futsal team. He plays  for Northeastern University Futsal Club in Futsal Thailand League.

References

Kongla Lekkla
1986 births
Living people
Kongla Lekkla
Kongla Lekkla